Friedrich Pollock (22 May 1894 – 16 December 1970) was a German social scientist and philosopher. He was one of the founders of the Institute for Social Research in Frankfurt am Main, and a member of the Frankfurt School of neo-Marxist theory.

Life 
Friedrich Pollock was born to a leather factory owner in Freiburg im Breisgau. Pollock's Jewish-born father turned away from Judaism, and raised his son accordingly. Pollock was educated in finance 1911 to 1915. During this time he met Max Horkheimer, with whom he became a lifelong friend. He then studied economy, sociology and philosophy in Frankfurt am Main, where he wrote his thesis on Marx's labor theory of value and received his doctorate in 1923.

The Institute for Social Research was founded in 1923 by Pollock and fellow Marxist Felix Weil, who funded the group. Weil was inspired to found the institute after the success of his week-long conference, the Erste Marxistische Arbeitswoche (First Marxist Workweek), in 1923. Weil's goal was to bring together different schools of Marxism, and included György Lukács, Karl Korsch, Karl August Wittfogel, and Friedrich Pollock.

In 1927/1928 Pollock traveled to the Soviet Union in honor of the tenth anniversary of the October Revolution. His research there led to his treatise: Attempts at Planned Economy in the Soviet Union 1917–1927.  Thereafter he took a post as lecturer at the University of Frankfurt and he replaced the ill Carl Grünberg as Director of the institute from 1928–1930.

Prior to the Nazi seizure of power, Pollock had used his contacts in the International Labour Organization to establish a Geneva branch of the Institute. In 1933, Pollock and Horkheimer moved into exile, first in Geneva, then to London, Paris, and finally New York City.

In 1950, he was finally able to return to Frankfurt, taking part in the reestablishment of the Institute, again taking the role of director. From 1951 to 1958 he was professor of economics and sociology at the University of Frankfurt.

In 1959, Pollock and Horkheimer moved to Montagnola, Ticino, Switzerland, although Pollock held a position as professor Emeritus at the University of Frankfurt until 1963. He died in Montagnola in 1970.

Selected works 

 Werner Sombart's "Refutation" of Marxism, Leipzig, 1926

References

External links 
Frankfurt School page at Marxist.org

→

1894 births
1970 deaths
Writers from Freiburg im Breisgau
Goethe University Frankfurt alumni
Academic staff of Goethe University Frankfurt
20th-century German philosophers
German economists
Jewish emigrants from Nazi Germany to Switzerland
German sociologists
German Marxists
Jewish philosophers
Marxist writers
Marxist theorists
Revolution theorists
Frankfurt School
German male writers